Dom Silvério is a municipality in the Brazilian state of Minas Gerais.  As of 2020, the estimated population was 5,232.

See also
 List of municipalities in Minas Gerais

References 

Municipalities in Minas Gerais